The 1955 Chevrolet (sometimes referred to as '55 Chevy) is an automobile which was introduced by Chevrolet in Autumn 1954 for the 1955 model year. It is considered a huge turning point for the manufacturer and a major success. It was available in three models: the 150, 210, and Bel Air.

The 1955 Chevrolet was the first successful Chevrolet with an optional V8 engine. Chevrolet had produced an earlier car with a V8 in 1918 (Chevrolet Series D), which used a 36-horsepower overhead valve 288-cubic-inch V8, but it remained in production for only a year. In 1955, Chevrolet decided to fit its new car with an overhead valve V8 engine design, which was similar to the 1949 Oldsmobile "Rocket 88" V8 engine which was an earlier GM success. Chevrolet's new 265-cubic-inch overhead valve V8 was designed to be smaller, lighter, and more powerful than previous V8s in the auto industry, and would come to be known as the "Chevy small block".

However, the new small block engine in the 1955 Chevrolet had some early teething issues. Some problems existed with cracked pistons, there was no integrated oil filter, so an external bypass filter was offered as a factory or dealer option. Those who did not order the engine with the "oil filter option" dealt with a high frequency of oil changes. Even with the oil filter option, only part of the oil was actually filtered (the oil going through the thermostat). This issue was corrected for the next year when a full flow oil filter system was added to the engine.
Additionally, to keep performance and mileage levels high required spark plug and ignition points to be replaced on a regular basis. But other than those issues it was an easy to maintain engine. The small block Chevrolet V8 became so popular that Chevrolet still sells it today as an over the counter replacement engine or better known as a "crate engine". There have been various changes made to the engine to modernize it since its introduction in 1954 however the basic design of the original 265 remains in place.

Body design

Additionally, Chevrolet drastically changed its body design. 
The 1955 Chevrolet had smooth straight panels on the sides and hood. This was a major departure from previous years for Chevrolet. Although Ford introduced what would be the first "shoe box" body design in 1949, GM and Chrysler were slow to catch on, only slowly replacing some of their bubble-like hood and side panels with flatter ones each year, without achieving a full shoebox look by 1954. But in 1955, Chevrolet designed the entire car with the full shoebox look. Along with the flatter straighter panels, the 1955 also had modern cues like wrap-around glass on the windshield, and triangular tail lights that jutted outward. This new look, combined with new power and engineering, made the 1955 an instant hit with the buying public and a critical success.
 
The car's popular "shoe-box" body style and chassis were carried over to 1956 (with changes to some of the front and rear aesthetics and bottom body line), and then carried over to 1957 (where the body was lengthened several inches in the rear and more drastic aesthetic changes were made).

The 1955, 1956 and 1957 Chevrolets are sought after by collectors, enthusiasts and hot rodders, and the three model years are often referred to by the given nickname of the "tri-fives." Collectors will pay a premium for two-door models, and even more for the Bel Air version, especially the two-door hardtop (two-door, no side post). Today, 1955 Chevrolet two door hard tops command top dollar.

Options and trim
The 1955 Chevrolet also offered many other firsts for Chevrolet, including changing from a 6-volt to a 12-volt electrical system. The 1955 offered new options like air conditioning, power windows, power seats, power steering and power brakes. Other options included automatic light dimmers, door handle protectors, bumper protectors and "wonder-bar" radios. So many new options were available that some referred to the car as "Chevy's little Cadillac." Never before had so many options been offered for a car in the low-price field.

The 1955's top trim offering was the Bel-Air, which had more chrome than the 150 and 210. The Bel-Air, 210 and 150 model could be bought as a four-door, or could be bought as a two door with a post between the front and rear passenger windows, known as the two-door sedan.

The 210 and Bel Air models could also be had as a two-door hardtop, which was marketed as the "Sport Coupe." This body style had no post between the two side windows, resulting in a shorter roof and longer rear deck than the two door sedan. A convertible was also offered in the Bel Air series, featuring the same shorter roof and longer rear deck as the Sport Coupe.

1955 also saw the introduction of the Bel Air Nomad, a sporty two-door station wagon which featured frameless door glass and elongated side windows. The unique roof design of the Nomad came directly from the 1954 Corvette Nomad, a "dream car" designed to be shown at auto shows as a concept sport wagon. Although regarded as one of the most beautiful station wagon designs of Fifties, the Nomad sold poorly, partly due to its price tag (one of the most expensive models in the Bel Air lineup) as well as its lack of four doors. Also the Nomad's two-piece tailgate design was prone to let excess rainwater leak through to the interior.

The 1955 offered a wide array of colors. One solid color, which was standard for the 150, could be had for the 210 or Bel Air...or nineteen different two-tone color combinations were also available.

Along with a standard column-mounted three speed synchro-mesh transmission, the buyer of a 1955 Chevrolet could specify an optional overdrive unit to go with it, or the fully automatic two-speed Powerglide transmission. Although most everything was new in 1955 for Chevrolet, the reliable Powerglide was mostly unchanged from 1954.

Models
There were nine different variations of the three models made in 1955, with differences in body, roof type, number of doors, and available equipment, but not all possible combinations were sold.

Engines

The following engines were available on the 1955 Chevrolet:
 OHV Inline 6 cylinder: 235 cubic inch, 123 horsepower
 OHV Inline 6 cylinder: 235 cubic inches, 136 brake horsepower (SAE)
 OHV V8: 265 cubic inches, 162 brake horsepower (SAE)
 OHV V8: 265 cubic inches, 180 brake horsepower (SAE), also known as the "Power Pack" engine
 OHV V8: 265 cubic inches, 195 brake horsepower (SAE), late in the model year, known as the "Super Power Pack"

The 265 was new for 1955, and it was the first V8 available in a Chevrolet since 1918 Model "D" was offered. That car did not sell well due to its price during an oncoming recession throughout World War-I, so Chevrolet reverted to OHV inline 4-cylinder engines until 1929 when Chevrolet switched to an inline 6-cylinder engine. This reliable six cylinder would power Chevrolet cars until 1963 and was known as the "Stovebolt six". However, the new 265 V-8 in 1955 offered more power than the six, and weighed 100 pounds less.

The 265 was a big success, and was fitted to the majority of Chevrolet cars for decades in various cubic inch displacements. It is commonly referred to as the "Small Block Chevy" motor.

Transmissions
The car contained one of three transmission types, all with the shifter on the column:

 3-speed Synchromesh manual 
 3-speed Synchromesh manual with overdrive 
 2-speed automatic "powerglide."

All models had the three transmission options.

See also
 1917-1918 Chevrolet Series D V8, previous Chevrolet V8 engine

References

Chevrolet vehicles